The Áillohaš Music Award is an annual Sámi music award created to commemorate Nils-Aslak Áillohaš Valkeapää's 50th birthday in 1993. The winner of the award is announced on Holy Saturday in conjunction with the Sámi Grand Prix during the Sámi Easter Festival. It is conferred by the municipality of Kautokeino and the Kautokeino Sámi Association. The winner receives a monetary prize of 20,000 Norwegian crowns, a diploma, a piece of artwork, and a two-week stay at Lásságámmi.

History
The Áillohaš Music Award was created in 1993 by the Norwegian Sámi Association, the municipality of Kautokeino, and the Kautokeino Sámi Association. It has been awarded every year since 1993, including 2020 even though the Sámi Easter Festival had been cancelled. The recipient can be a Sámi musician or musicians, or a band.

The prize is awarded to honor the significant contributions the recipient or recipients has made to the diverse world of Sámi music. The first recipient of this award was Mari Boine. Over the years, quite a few of the most popular and famous Sámi musicians and bands have received this award, including Wimme, Sofia Jannok, Ulla Pirttijärvi-Länsman, and Frode Fjellheim have won the award. The award is not limited to just traditional Northern Sámi yoikers and as such, a wide variety of different music genres has been represented, from the heavy rock of Intrigue to the traditional Kildin Sámi luvvts collected, recorded, and performed by Domna Khomyuk.

Recipients

References

Áillohaš Music Award
Awards established in 1993
1993 establishments in Norway
Norwegian music awards
Sámi music